Sthree may refer to:
 SThree, is an international recruitment business
 Sthree (1950 film), a Malayalam film directed by R. Velappan Nair